Bazid Khan (born 25 March 1981) is a Pakistani cricket commentator and former cricketer.

In the 2021 edition of Wisden Cricketer's Almanack, he was named as the Schools Cricketer of the Year for his performances between 1998 and 2000.

Early life and family
Hailing from Burki tribe of Pashtuns, Khan belongs to a famous cricketing family, with his grandfather Jahangir Khan having represented India before the independence of Pakistan in 1947 and his father Majid (both of whom were Cambridge Blues), and uncles Imran Khan (the former Prime Minister of Pakistan) and Javed Burki having all captained Pakistan.

Khan received his education from the Brighton College.

Career
With a combination of an orthodox technique in batting and a reliably calm temperament, Khan began playing for the Pakistani Under-19s at the age of just 15, and moved to England to finish his cricketing and academic education. He played in the same Brighton College (where he studied between 1998 and 2000) team as Matt Prior when they won 20 matches in 1999, and also later played at the Marylebone Cricket Club.

Having enjoyed an excellent 2003–04 season, having averaged over 70, Khan was finally given his chance to shine for Pakistan in a triangular tournament early the following season. He has played seven youth Test matches, as well as a single senior Test, and made his Test debut in the 2nd Test against the West Indies, making the family the second, after the Headleys, to have grandfather, father and son as Test cricketers. In the 2004–05 Quaid-e-Azam Trophy, Khan scored 300 not out batting for Rawalpindi against Hyderabad.

References

External links
 

1981 births
Living people
Pakistan One Day International cricketers
Pakistan Test cricketers
Cricketers from Lahore
People educated at Brighton College
Pashtun people
Pakistani cricketers
Pakistani cricket commentators
Rawalpindi cricketers
Khan Research Laboratories cricketers
Federal Areas cricketers
Redco Pakistan Limited cricketers
Public Works Department cricketers
Islamabad cricketers
Lahore City cricketers
Lahore Blues cricketers
Pakistan International Airlines cricketers
Islamabad Leopards cricketers
Rawalpindi Rams cricketers
Bazid
Aitchison College alumni